Aquitania is a town and municipality in Boyacá Department, Colombia, part of the Sugamuxi Province, a subregion of Boyaca. Aquitania borders Sogamoso, Cuítiva and Mongua in the north, Zetaquirá, San Eduardo and Páez in the south, Labranzagrande, Pajarito, Recetor and Chámeza in the east and Cuítiva, Tota, Zetaquirá and San Eduardo in the west. The town of Aquitania borders Lake Tota to the east.

Climate

History 
Before the Spanish conquest of the Muisca, Aquitania was called "Guáquia" and was inhabited by the indigenous Muisca people. The area was ruled by the iraca of Sugamuxi. Conquistador Juan de San Martín reached the area in 1540. Modern Aquitania was founded in 1777.

Economy 
Commercial agricultural products grown in Aquitaine include onions, peas, corn, and potatoes.

Born in Aquitania 
 Arsenio Chaparro Cardoso, former professional cyclist
 Freddy Montaña, professional cyclist

Gallery

References 

Municipalities of Boyacá Department
Populated places established in 1777
1777 establishments in the Spanish Empire
Muisca Confederation